Feijó Airport  is the airport serving Feijó, Brazil.

History
The airport was built as a replacement to Alcimar Leitão Airport (ICAO code SWFJ), which was located closer to the city center. The new airport was opened in 2008 when the old facility was closed.

Airlines and destinations
No scheduled flights operate at this airport.

Access

See also

List of airports in Brazil

References

External links

Airports in Acre (state)
Airports established in 2008